John Rauch (1927–2008) was an American football player and coach.

John Rauch may also refer to:

 John Henry Rauch (1828–1894), American sanitarian
 John Rauch (architect) (1930–2022), American architect
 John T. Rauch (fl. 1989–2021), U.S. Air Force general

See also
 Johannes Rauch
 Jon Rauch (born 1978), former baseball pitcher
 Jonathan Rauch (born 1960), American journalist